Amaurochaetaceae is an family of slime molds in the order Stemonitidales.

Genera
Amaurochaete
Brefeldia
Comatricha
Enerthenema
Stemonaria
Stemonitopsis
Paradiacheopsis

References

Myxogastria
Amoebozoa families